The genus Empidonax is a group of small insect-eating passerine birds in the tyrant flycatcher family, the Tyrannidae. The genus name Empidonax is from Ancient Greek empis, "gnat", and anax, "master".

Most of these birds are very similar in plumage: olive on the upper parts with light underparts, eye rings and wing bars. In the nesting season they may be distinguished by range, habitat and call; in other situations, particularly on migration and in winter, it may not be possible to be sure of specific identification.

Empidonax flycatchers often flick their wings and tails rapidly.

Euler's flycatcher, Lathrotriccus euleri and gray-breasted flycatcher, Lathrotriccus griseipectus were formerly placed in Empidonax, but differ anatomically and biochemically and are now placed in the genus Lathrotriccus.

Species
The genus contains 15 species:

References

External links

Generic Study of Euler's Flycatcher

 
Bird genera
Taxa named by Jean Cabanis